Hajipur Junction, (station code HJP), is a major railway station and headquarters in the Sonpur division of East Central Railway zone of the Indian Railways. Hajipur Junction is located in Hajipur city in the Indian state of Bihar.  Hajipur is the district headquarters of Vaishali district and is located at 33 km by rail route from Patna Junction. East Central Railway was inaugurated on 8 September 1996 with headquarters at Hajipur, Bihar. It became operational on 1st October 2002.

Hajipur is well connected with various major cities of Bihar like Patna, Sonpur, Vaishali, Muzaffarpur, Samastipur, and Chhapra. Hajipur Junction railway station is directly connected to most of the major cities in India.

History 

The construction of railway line through Hajipur was completed and opened in 1862. Hajipur is the headquarters of the East Central Railway zone of the Indian Railways.

The -long Hajipur–Muzaffarpur line was opened in 1884. A new second bridge on river Gandak has been opened (5.5 km) between Sonpur Junction and Hajipur for double line traffic for this section.  The electrification work in Patna–Sonepur–Hajipur section was completed by July 2016.

Lines 
Three rail lines connect it to Muzaffarpur, Barauni and Sonpur. Via Sonpur one can go to Chhapra and  Patna.

Facilities 
The major facilities are mechanised cleaning, free Wi-Fi in entire Junction, available are waiting rooms, computerised reservation facility, reservation counter, vehicle parking etc. There are five platforms that are interconnected with two foot overbridges.

Facilities include waiting rooms, computerized reservation facility. A new entry point has been constructed and commissioned on north side in addition to previous one on south side. This railway station is also equipped with RailTel WI-FI facility provided by  joint venture Indian Railways and Google.

Trains 
Hajipur Junction served by several Express and Superfast trains from all over the country. Several electrified local Passenger trains also run from Hajipur Junction to neighbouring destinations on frequent intervals.

The  line passes through the Digha–Sonpur rail–road bridge, connecting North Bihar and South Bihar, and the Gangetic Plain in Bihar.

Nearest Airports 
 Lok Nayak Jayaprakash Airport, Patna 
 Gaya Airport 
 Darbhanga Airport

See also 
 East Central Railway zone

References

External links 
 
 Official Website of Sonpur Division
 Official website of the East Central Railway zone

Transport in Hajipur
Railway stations in Vaishali district
Railway junction stations in Bihar
Sonpur railway division
Railway stations opened in 1862
1862 establishments in India